Z333 or variant, may refer to:

 Wisdom (albatross), the oldest known wild bird, which was banded in 1951 and still alive in the 2020s, whose original band number is Z333
 NORAD Cross City radar station (site id: J-10, NORAD id: Z-333), Florida, USA; part of the NORAD Joint Surveillance System
 "Of old when heroes thought it base" (1690, ode, id: Z 333), a composition by Henry Purcell; see List of compositions by Henry Purcell

See also
 Z33 (disambiguation)
 Z3 (disambiguation)